The Myanmar Port Authority (abbreviated MPA) is a government agency vested with the responsibility to regulate and administer the coastal ports of Myanmar.  It is a department of the Ministry of Transport.  The MPA was founded in 1989 and is located in Yangon.

History
The modern era of the Port of Yangon began in 1880 with the Commissioners for the Port of Rangoon. In 1954, the Board of Management for the Port of Rangoon was established, and then in 1972 the Burma Ports Corporation. The MPA was founded in 1989 to replace the Burma Ports Corporation. In March 2011, MPA began collaborating with a Chinese firm, CCCC TDC Tianjin Dredging, to begin dredging the Port of Yangon, to increase the size of vessels that can dock at the port (to 35,000 tons deadweight, up from the current capacity of 15,000).

MPA has been involved in contracts to develop Myanmar's Special Economic Zones, including a US$8.6 billion deal to develop a deep sea port at Dawei, by Italian-Thai Development.

It was reported in 2010 that state-owned ports run by the MPA will be privatised. The country's largest port, Thilawa Port, is currently operated by a Hong Kong-based firm, while another in Ahlone Township is run by Asia World.

On 17 March 2012, Japanese firm MOL, began a twice-weekly container service between the Port of Yangon and Singapore.

8 new Yangon area ports complete jun1st 2019.

Headquarters
The Myanmar  Port Authority headquarters are located on Strand Road, Yangon, housed in a colonial-era building, designated in the Yangon City Heritage List.

Ports
The coast of Myanmar fronts on the Indian Ocean's Bay of Bengal and Andaman Sea.  Major port facilities administered by the MPA include:
Myanmar Port Authority, Yangon
Asia World Port Terminal, located in Ahlone Township of Yangon 
Myanmar Industrial Port, Yangon
Myanmar International Terminal Thilawa, (MITT) 25 km from Yangon
(only facility to handle vessels with 200 metre in length, 9-metre draft and 20,000-tonnage) 
Myanmar Integrated Port Limited (MIPL), Yangon

Other ports
Other significant ports in Myanmar include: (90% of trade handle in Yangon ports not incl Thilawa as of 2019)

In Rakhine State:
Sittwe
Kyaukphyu
Thandwe
In Ayeyarwady Division:
Pathein
In Mon State:
Mawlamyine
In Tanintharyi Division (of the Kra Isthmus):
Dawei
Myeik
Kawthaung

See also

Port authority
Port operator
Container terminal

References

External links
MyanmarPort Authority official site
ASEAN Ports, Myanmar Port Authority

Government agencies of Myanmar
Water transport in Myanmar
Myanmar
Yangon
 
Government buildings in Myanmar
Buildings and structures in Yangon
Buildings and structures completed in 1933